Hi Fly (legally Springjet, S.A.) is a Portuguese charter airline headquartered in Lisbon.

History

The airline was incorporated in October 2005 and concluded its initial certification process in April 2006, when it was issued with an Air Operator Certificate by the Portugal civil aviation authority, ANAC. Since obtaining its Air Operator Certificate, the carrier has gained all the statutory EU-OPS (regulations specifying minimum safety and related procedures for commercial passenger and cargo fixed-wing aviation) and European Union Safety Agency (EASA) approvals. It also obtained the IATA Operational Safety Audit (IOSA) certification in September 2011.

Hi Fly's first aircraft was an Airbus A330-300 which had previously been operated by Air Luxor (which was owned by the same family that now owns Hi Fly before being sold and shut down). The aircraft was recently on contract to the Air Component of the Belgian Armed Forces until the end of 2013. Two A310-300s were then added in 2008 and these were leased to Oman Air flying the carrier's first long-haul routes (to London Heathrow and Bangkok).

New aircraft were then delivered from Airbus in 2008 and 2009: an A330-200 and two A340-500s, the latter used for approximately 5 years on behalf of Arik Air in Nigeria on its route between Lagos and New York John F. Kennedy, painted in its colors, until Hi Fly repossessed the airframes in spring 2015. Since then, more A330s and A340s have also been obtained, including four in 2013. In February 2014, Hi Fly added its first narrow-body aircraft, an A321-200 that has been leased to the Belgian Army in replacement of the former A330-300.

At the start of March 2013, Hi Fly Malta was created as Hi Fly's Maltese subsidiary operating a fleet of Airbus A340-600s; that division now houses a pair of A340-300s.

Hi Fly's head office is located in Lisbon's city centre. Inside are all the corporate offices plus departments for flight and ground operations, engineering and maintenance, safety, security, commercial, finance and administration, as well as quality control. There are also training classrooms for flight and cabin crews. At Lisbon Airport there is a maintenance hangar operated by MESA, a group subsidiary.

In May 2015, Saudi-Arabian airline Saudia immediately terminated a long-term leasing contract with Hi Fly over two Airbus A330s, after one of them was seen at Ben Gurion Airport in Israel wearing the full Saudia livery. According to Israeli media reports, the A330 was undergoing routine maintenance with Israel Aerospace Industries' MRO wing Bedek as per its contract with Hi Fly. However, Arab News reported that even though the aircraft was not operating a commercial service for Saudia at the time, the Saudis claimed that Hi Fly had violated the terms of its contract by sending the jet to a country with which Saudi Arabia has no official diplomatic ties. Hi Fly subsequently returned the aircraft to its lessor along with its remaining A330-300.

Hi Fly is testing  serving passengers with compostable materials in the food and drink service rather than single-use plastic. A flight in December 2018 was the first ever without single-use cups, cutlery and containers.

On 29 June 2019, a Hi Fly airlines A340 returning to Orlando Airport dumped its fuel on over 84% of the airport's runway. The plane had been suffering hydraulic issues and was forced to return. It was not clear why the pilot dumped the fuel on the runway.

On 2 November 2021, Hi Fly Flight 801 landed the first Airbus A340 on Antarctic blue glacial ice after a flight from Cape Town, South Africa to Wolf’s Fang Runway, Antarctica.

Destinations
Hi Fly has no scheduled destinations. It specialises in worldwide aircraft leases and ACMI services on medium to long term contracts for airlines, tour operators, governments, companies and individuals.

In 2021 Hi Fly was one of the airlines used to deport asylum seekers from the United Kingdom to Rwanda

Fleet

Current
As of January 2023, the Hi Fly fleet – excluding its subsidiary Hi Fly Malta – consists of the following aircraft:

Former
Hi Fly has operated the following types of aircraft in the past:

See also
List of airlines of Portugal

References

External links

Official website

Airlines of Portugal
Airlines established in 2005
Companies based in Lisbon